The Netherlands Proteomics Centre (NPC) is a Dutch research center in the field of proteomics. The research is focused on the proteome, the entire set of proteins expressed by a genome, cell, tissue or organism.

The NPC was established by Prof. Dr. Albert Heck in 2003 and is located in the city of Utrecht. NPC is part of the Netherlands Genomics Initiative (NGI).

Cooperating institutions 

Within NPC there is a cooperation between seven universities, four academic medical centers and a number of biotechnology companies:

 Utrecht University (UU)
 University Medical Center Utrecht (UMCU)
 University of Groningen (RUG)
 Leiden University (LU)
 Leiden University Medical Center (LUMC)
 Delft University of Technology (TU Delft)
 Radboud University Nijmegen (RUN)
 University of Amsterdam (UvA)
 Academic Medical Center (AMC)
 Wageningen University and Research Centre (WUR/PRI)
 Erasmus MC
 Dutch Cancer Institute (NKI)
 Dutch Vaccin Institute (NVI)
 AMOLF
 Hubrecht Institute

Board 
 Prof. Dr. Albert Heck
 Dr. Werner Most
 Prof. Dr. Geert Kops
 Prof dr. Hermen Overkleeft
 Prof. Dr. Bert Poolman
 Prof. Dr. Rob Liskamp

References

External links 
  Website of the Netherlands Proteomics Centre

Proteomics organizations
Research institutes in the Netherlands
Utrecht University